Lake Tulloch, located in Copperopolis, California, is one of the few lakes in California that has private shoreline houses. Lake Tulloch  provides water needs to downstream users and hydroelectricity to users throughout the state.

Background

Lake Tulloch had its start in the 1880s with Charles H. Tulloch who acquired a small ditch and water rights in the Central Valley of California. The ditch was originally made by miners for placer gravel. Furthermore, local farmers saw it as a great resource to irrigate their crops. The local farmers widened the ditch, thus irrigating  in Oakdale and South San Joaquin. The Oakdale Irrigation District (OID) and the South San Joaquin Irrigation District (SSJID) paid $650,000 to co-own water rights from Tulloch's expanded ditch on the Stanislaus River in July 1910. The two districts received their first license from the Federal Energy Regulatory Commission (FERC) to begin the Tulloch Project. Their permit was effective January 1, 1955 through December 31, 2004 Two years later, the districts received another license on February 28, 2006, that would give them an additional forty years to operate and expire on January 1, 2046.

Tri-Dam Project 

The Donnells dam, Beardsley dam and Tulloch dam projects are located in Tuolumne County, California on the Middle Fork of the Stanislaus River. OID and SSJID co-developed the "Upper Works" (Donnells and Beardsley) and the "Lower Works" (Lake Tulloch) of the Tri-Dam Project Donnells Reservoir, Beardsley Reservoir, and Lake Tulloch were fully operational just two years after its making was agreed upon in 1955 The Tri-Dam met the irrigation obligations and in the 1980s added small hydro-power plants to the dams to provide electricity. The hydro- power plants are now currently controlled by the Turlock Irrigation District. The Tri-Dam project is currently composed of the dams, tunnels, penstocks, powerhouses, communications systems, and offices. All in which are stationed on the Middle Fork of the Stanislaus River. The Tri-Dam Project administrative offices are in Strawberry, California. There is a General Manager who manages the daily activities of the Tri-Dam Project and the Tri-Dam Power. The General Manager then provides information to the five members on the joint board of directors. The Tri-Dam Power Authority is separate from the Tri-Dam Project, but the General Manager is the chief executive officer for both of them.

Recreation  
The lake provides a variety of recreation uses for visitors and residents, including boating, fishing, swimming, and camping. At South Lake Tulloch RV Campground and Marina, there are 130 waterfront sites that include, lakefront cabins, RV campgrounds with 50 amp hook up service, tent sites with water, picnic tables, and fire pits, and lastly, bathrooms, showers, and a laundromat are located conveniently for visitors. Also available at South Lake Tulloch RV Campground and Marina is a restaurant, a general store, gas dock, and boat rentals. Commonly caught near or in Lake Tulloch are Rainbow Trout, Brown Trout, Largemouth Bass, Smallmouth Bass, Catfish, Crappie, and Bluegill.

References

Reservoirs in California
Reservoirs in Tuolumne County, California